The Minister for Foreign Affairs is the head of the Ministry for Foreign Affairs. The current Minister for Foreign Affairs is Þórdís Kolbrún R. Gylfadóttir.

List of ministers

Minister for Foreign Affairs (18 November 1941 – 1 January 1970)

Minister for Foreign Affairs (1 January 1970 – present)
The Cabinet of Iceland Act no. 73/1969, which had been passed by the parliament 28 May 1969, took effect on 1 January 1970. Thus the Cabinet was formally established along with its ministries which had up until then not formally existed separately from the ministers.

References

External links
Official website 
Official website 

 Foreign affairs